The Utility Muffin Research Kitchen (UMRK) is a recording studio built in 1979 by musician, composer, songwriter, and bandleader Frank Zappa at his home in Los Angeles, California. The home and recording studio has been owned by Lady Gaga since 2016.

History
Frank Zappa built the studio in his 6,759-square-foot home in Laurel Canyon, completing it on September 1, 1979. The studio was custom designed by Rudy Brewer with input from Zappa and his technical staff. The estimated construction costs ranged between $1.5 and $3.5 million.

Soon after the studio was completed, Ken Scott engineered the four song debut EP  by Missing Persons at UMRK. In 1982 two tracks from the EP were re-issued on the band's debut studio album, Spring Session M.

In July, 1980, Zappa began recording at the UMRK several songs that were eventually released on the album You Are What You Is. Zappa would utilize the studio regularly until his death in 1993. 

In 2016, Lady Gaga purchased the Zappa homestead, including the Utility Muffin Research Kitchen. It is one of the studios she used for the recording of her sixth album, Chromatica.

UMRK Mobile
The UMRK Mobile Studio was a remote recording bus purchased from Mike Love of the Beach Boys. The studio bus needed extensive repairs and upgrades after years of sitting idle at Love's home. The mobile studio was used in the first cable TV / FM "Simulcast" for Zappa's Halloween show on October 31, 1981. The show was broadcast live on MTV from the Palladium in New York City, with the audio-only portion broadcast over FM's new "Starfleet Radio" network. The broadcast was engineered from the UMRK bus by Zappa's longtime audio engineer Mark G. Pinske.

References in music
The first known mention of "Utility Muffin Research Kitchen" was in the 1975 song "Muffin Man" on the album Bongo Fury.

In the conclusion of Zappa's Joe's Garage, Joe, the protagonist, gives in to conformity and gets a job on the assembly line at the Utility Muffin Research Kitchen; the narration describing his job there is nearly identical to the opening narration from "Muffin Man".

References

External links
Dweezil Zappa: 64-bit Computing & The Frank Zappa Archive - soundonsound.com

Frank Zappa
Lady Gaga
Recording studios in California
1979 establishments in California